The fourth season of the television comedy series Arrested Development premiered on Netflix on May 26, 2013 and consists of 15 episodes.  It serves as a revival to the series after it was canceled by Fox in 2006.

The storyline centers on the Bluth family, a formerly wealthy, habitually dysfunctional family, and the show incorporates hand-held camera work, narration, archival photos, and historical footage.

Unlike other seasons, each episode of the fourth season occurs over approximately the same stretch of time, but focuses on a different character. Information on events depicted in a given episode is often partial and filled in by later episodes. In 2018, a recut version of the season was released, titled Season 4 Remix: Fateful Consequences. In contrast to the original cut, it presented the events in chronological order.

Production

Original release
Six years after the series was canceled by Fox, filming for a revived fourth season began on August 7, 2012. The season consists of 15 new episodes, all debuting at the same time on Netflix on May 26, 2013, in the United States, Canada, the United Kingdom, Ireland, Latin America, and the Nordics. Several actors who had recurring roles in the original series returned to reprise their roles, including Henry Winkler as Barry Zuckerkorn, Mae Whitman as Ann Veal, Ben Stiller as Tony Wonder, Scott Baio as Bob Loblaw, Judy Greer as Kitty Sanchez, and Liza Minnelli as Lucille Austero, while new characters are played by John Slattery, Terry Crews and Isla Fisher. The plot of the season focuses on the fictional production of a film based on the Bluth family scandal and what the characters have been doing since 2006. There were plans to have George Clooney make a cameo appearance for a joke centered on Mitt Romney but it never came together. This plot line ended up being revisited, without Clooney, in 2018’s Season 5.

The show format is different compared to previous seasons: each of the fifteen episodes focuses on one individual character—with every episode happening at the same time within the show's universe—showing the character's activities since the conclusion of the third season.  According to Jason Bateman, "If I'm driving down the street in my episode and Gob's going down the sidewalk on his Segway, you could stop my episode, go into his episode, and follow him and see where he's going". Part of the reason for this format was the challenge with getting the cast together to shoot on the same dates. "We shot for Netflix and of course everybody was busy, so everybody had a different shooting schedule. I did scenes with light stands with an X in tape put on them. I would have a conversation with Jeffrey Tambor, then I would turn to my right and have a conversation with Jessica Walters, but both of them were light stands instead," said Henry Winkler in a November 2017 interview with Uproxx.

Michael Cera joined the writing crew for season 4, the first cast member to do so. Netflix CEO Reed Hastings and creator Mitchell Hurwitz previously stated that season four would be the final season of the show, and that the revival serves as a "one-off" and "act one of a movie". However, a Netflix spokesperson later went on to say, "We're hopeful there will be more seasons" and "...by no means is this the end of it. We're definitely planning to do more with them."

Arrested Development Season 4 Remix: Fateful Consequences
In October 2014, Hurwitz said that a re-edit of season 4 was being done to tell the story in chronological order. Ron Howard recorded new voice-over material for the recut. On May 1, 2018, Hurwitz announced via Twitter that the chronological re-edit would be released on May 4, 2018. The recut is titled Arrested Development Season 4 Remix: Fateful Consequences, and Hurwitz stated that it will "shuffle the content from 15 individualized stories into 22 interwoven stories the length of the original series."

Following the remixed release on Netflix, several of the cast members, including Jason Bateman, Will Arnett, Michael Cera and David Cross, requested additional compensation for the remixed episodes, which they state include unused footage shot for the original format of the season's episodes. Representatives for the actors also considered that the remixed version made it a potential vehicle for syndication that would lead to financial gain for 20th Century Fox Television but not for the actors. According to these representatives, 20th Century had stated that they have the right to reedit the episodes as they saw fit without consulting the actors. The studio later agreed to pay the actors for the additional seven episodes based on their original season 4 salaries.

Cast

Main 
 Jason Bateman as Michael Bluth
 Portia de Rossi as Lindsay Bluth Fünke
 Will Arnett as Gob Bluth
 Michael Cera as George-Michael Bluth 
 Alia Shawkat as Maeby Fünke
 Tony Hale as Buster Bluth
 David Cross as Tobias Fünke
 Jeffrey Tambor as George Bluth, Sr./Oscar Bluth
 Jessica Walter as Lucille Bluth
 Ron Howard as Narrator/himself

Returning guest cast

New guest cast

Marketing and promotion 

In October 2012, Netflix chief content officer Ted Sarandos premiered footage from the fourth season for the attendees of TheWrap's annual conference TheGrill. The clip featured Buster Bluth (Tony Hale) helping his mother Lucille Bluth (Jessica Walter) smoke a cigarette, because the ankle-bracelet monitor she's wearing under house arrest prevents her from leaving her hotel room. Following that, a set photo was released showing the Bluth company stair car, now having the Austero-Bluth Company logo referencing to Liza Minnelli's character, Lucille Austero, having more stake in the company. Set photos showing Tony Hale as Buster Bluth saluting at someone's funeral were released online. The first promotional images of the entire cast together were released in the October 12, 2012, issue of Entertainment Weekly magazine. These included a cover picture, along with two pictures of the entire cast in restoration-era outfits. The first official teaser poster for the new season was released on April 4, 2013, on the show's Facebook page, along with the announcement that the 15-episode season would premiere on Netflix on May 26, 2013. Netflix released the first trailer for the fourth season online on May 12, 2013.

In March 2013, series executive producer and narrator Ron Howard stated that "We're still hoping to build to a movie and in a lot of ways, getting the Bluth family on people's radar, in a kind of contemporary way, so we can move forward with it as a movie". He stated that the film had not yet been green-lit, saying, "It's not a happening thing, but it's something that is being discussed". The same month, Hurwitz stated that he was "confident that we will succeed at [making the film]", saying "there is a bigger story out there that does exist" for the film.

Episodes

Original release (2013) 
 Season 4 Remix: Fateful Consequences (2018)

Reception

Critical response
Reviews of the fourth season were generally positive, with Bateman's performance receiving high praise. On Rotten Tomatoes, it holds an approval rating of 79% with an average score of 7.93/10, based on 34 reviews. The site's critical consensus reads, "Though this new incarnation of the hit series isn't quite as effective, Arrested Developments fourth season still delivers the dark humor and running gags we've come to expect." On the review aggregator website, Metacritic, the fourth season has a weighted average score of 72 out of 100, based on 21 critics, indicating "generally favorable reviews". 

Mike Hale, writing for The New York Times after watching the first eight episodes, said that "Along the way there are doses of self-referential and metafictional humor that have made the show a cult item—enough for fans to compile lists, but not enough to re-enliven the episodes or distract from the story's dullness". Robert Lloyd, writing for the Los Angeles Times, praised the series, suggesting that it improves after several episodes. The A.V. Clubs Emily VanDerWerff graded the season overall with a 'B', writing that "It is, in places, masterful. It is also, in other places, at once weirdly pleased with itself and too ready to hold the audience's hand where that hand needn't be held", and that "The scope of the whole project is hard to deny for its ambition and audacity." David M. Cook of WhatCulture! gave the new season a positive review calling it "The Triumphant Return Of The Bluths". He said "it was great to see the Bluths return in such fine form" and that he "found a lot of the season to be funnier than anything that had come before it". Gem Wheeler of Den of Geek argued that the fourth season was "Arrested Developments best yet", and "the Bluths officially rule the pop culture landscape. Long may they reign."

Brian Lowry of Variety gave the season a negative review, writing, "Ultimately, this 'Arrested' revival plays a bit like a reunion special, where the individual cast members come out and take their curtain calls. After the warmth of seeing them reunited (or semi-reunited, given how rarely more than one or two are featured in a scene together), there's a sort of awkwardness to it, as if nobody really has much to say. We're meant to bask in the nostalgia, while the particulars are of relatively little consequence."  Nathan Rabin of The Wall Street Journal similarly wrote, "Arrested Development has lost a step or two in its long stint on the sidelines. The pacing is notably slower than during its original run and the show lacks the breathtaking density that characterized its glorious past. At its worst, the new/old Arrested Development is reduced to doing a shaky imitation of itself: the characters and themes are there but the beats are slightly off, as is the tone". David Pierce of The Verge also gave it a mixed review, writing "Season four is kind of a confused mess, but then so is the Bluth family — and both somehow work despite all the chaos. From the way it was shot to the way it was released, the show was an experiment — covering a few events many ways, showing us the world through every character's eyes. It's very clearly just set-up in the larger sense, building toward something bigger for Arrested Development. But the question is, what's next?" He also commented positively, saying, "Season four is absolutely worthy of the Arrested Development name, though you'll have to slog through three episodes before it becomes so".

The season 4 remix, Fateful Consequences, received generally negative reviews from critics. On Rotten Tomatoes, it holds an approval rating of 25% with an average score of 5.3/10, based on 12 reviews. The site's critical consensus reads, "They've made a huge mistake."

Accolades

The fourth season earned the series three Primetime Emmy Award nominations for the 65th Primetime Emmy Awards, including Outstanding Lead Actor in a Comedy Series for Jason Bateman, Outstanding Single-Camera Picture Editing for a Comedy Series, and Outstanding Music Composition for a Series. For the 20th Screen Actors Guild Awards, the cast was nominated for Best Comedy Ensemble and Jason Bateman was nominated for Best Comedy Actor. Bateman also received a nomination for Best Comedy Actor for the 71st Golden Globe Awards.

Future

Planned film
Show creator Mitchell Hurwitz said that the fourth season would serve as the precursor to a future full-length Arrested Development film.  Rumors of a film circulated after the possibility was suggested in the final episode of the third season, "Development Arrested". In 2008, it was reported that production of Arrested Development: The Movie would begin after the completion of the fourth season, with a script to be written by Hurwitz. In 2008, Ron Howard was slated to direct the film. At the time it was reported that all original members of the main cast were expected to reprise their original roles. In August 2013, Hurwitz commented "I'm working on the movie right now" and his plan was to do another season after the film is completed. However, season 5 was released in May 2018, without any work progressing on a film. In October 2018, star David Cross said he thought the show was done and there would be no film.

Fifth season

Netflix confirmed on May 17, 2017, that a fifth season featuring the full cast had been ordered and that the season would include 16 episodes split into two eight-episode parts; the first half was released on May 29, 2018, and the second was released on March 15, 2019.

Home media
The fourth season was released on DVD in region 1 on December 16, 2014, in region 2 on June 9, 2014, and in region 4 on August 27, 2014.

References

External links 
 
 

 
2013 American television seasons
Drones in fiction
Works about the Great Recession